The E-Branch Guide to Psionics is a 1996 role-playing game supplement for Brian Lumley's The World of Necroscope published by West End Games.

Contents
The E-Branch Guide to Psionics is a supplement about the E-Branch, a top-secret organization under the control of the British government
that specializes in intelligence operations involving psychic powers.

Reception
Andy Butcher reviewed The E-Branch Guide to Psionics for Arcane magazine, rating it a 5 out of 10 overall. Butcher comments that "Fans of Lumley will be interested to see how the powers, which help maintain Necroscope'''s unique feel, have been implemented in the game. But even then it's hardly required reading for more casual players."

ReviewsPyramid'' V1, #23 (Jan./Feb., 1997)

References

Role-playing game books
Role-playing game supplements introduced in 1996